Duke of Grimaldi is a hereditary title in the Peerage of Spain, accompanied by the dignity of Grandee and granted in 1777 by Charles III to Pablo Jerónimo de Grimaldi, who was Prime Minister of Spain as Secretary of State and a member of the House of Grimaldi, the princely family of Monaco.

When the second duke died, the title became vacant for almost a century, until Alfonso XIII rehabilitated it on behalf of María del Rosario Patiño y Losada, the most senior direct descendant of the last titleholder, thus becoming the 3rd Duchess of Grimaldi in 1927.

Dukes of Grimaldi (1777)
Pablo Jerónimo de Grimaldi y Pallavicini, 1st Duke of Grimaldi (1710-1789)
Francisco María Grimaldi y Spínola, 2nd Duke of Grimaldi (?-?), nephew of the 1st Duke

Dukes of Grimaldi (1927)
María del Rosario Patiño y Losada, 3rd Duchess of Grimaldi (1902-1942), direct descendant of the 2nd Duke
José Joaquín Márquez y Patiño, 4th Duke of Grimaldi (1923-1973), son of the 3rd Duchess
José Joaquín Márquez y Ulloa, 5th Duke of Grimaldi (1949-1999), son of the 4th Duke
José Joaquín Márquez y Pries, 6th Duke of Grimaldi (b. 1978), son of the 5th Duke

See also
List of dukes in the peerage of Spain
List of current Grandees of Spain

References

Dukedoms of Spain
Grandees of Spain
Lists of dukes
Lists of Spanish nobility